The FIVB Volleyball Women's Club World Championship is an international women's club volleyball competition organised by the Fédération Internationale de Volleyball (FIVB), the sport's global governing body. The competition was first contested in 1991 in Brazil. It was not held between 1995 and 2009, but since 2010, the competition has been held every year, and has been hosted by Qatar, Switzerland, the Philippines, Japan, China and Turkey. The competition was held in Zhejiang Province of China in 2018 and 2019. After the 2020 championship was cancelled due to corona virus pandemic, the competition was held in Turkey in 2021.

The tournament involved six to eight teams over the years competing for the title at venues within the host nation over a period of about one week. Teams involved the winners of that year's AVC Club Volleyball Championship (Asia), African Clubs Championship (Africa), Women's South American Volleyball Club Championship (South America) and CEV Women's Champions League (Europe), the host city's team, a nominated team from North America, as well as wild card invitees.

The current champions are Italian club Imoco Volley Conegliano, who defeated Turkish club Vakıfbank İstanbul 3–1 in the final of the 2022 edition, to win their second title in the competition. Turkish teams have been the most successful, with seven titles in total.

Results summary

Results by confederation

Medals summary

Medal table by club

Medal table by country

MVP by edition
1991 –  Ida Alvares (Sadia São Paulo)
1992 –  Ana Flávia Sanglard (Minas Tênis Clube)
1994 –  Ana Moser (Leite Moça Sorocaba)
2010 –  Katarzyna Skowrońska-Dolata (Fenerbahçe)
2011 –  Nataša Osmokrović (Rabita Baku)
2012 –  Sheilla Castro (Osasco)
2013 –  Jovana Brakočević (Vakıfbank İstanbul)
2014 –  Yekaterina Gamova (Dinamo Kazan)
2015 –  Jordan Larson (Eczacıbaşı VitrA)
2016 –  Tijana Bošković (Eczacıbaşı VitrA)
2017 –  Zhu Ting (Vakıfbank İstanbul)
2018 –  Zhu Ting (Vakıfbank İstanbul)
2019 –  Paola Egonu (Imoco Volley Conegliano)
2021 -  Isabelle Haak (Vakıfbank İstanbul)
2022 -  Isabelle Haak (Imoco Volley Conegliano)

See also
Men's
 African Clubs Championship
 Asian Men's Club Volleyball Championship
 CEV Champions League
 CEV Challenge Cup
 CEV Cup
 FIVB Volleyball Men's Club World Championship
 Men's South American Volleyball Club Championship
Women's
 Asian Women's Club Volleyball Championship
 CEV Women's Champions League
 CEV Women's Challenge Cup
 CEV Cup Women's
 Women's African Clubs Championship
 Women's South American Volleyball Club Championship

Notes

References

External links
Fédération Internationale de Volleyball – official website
FIVB Volleyball Women's Club World Championship Honours (1989–2012)

 
International women's volleyball competitions
Volleyball

Club, Women's
Sports club competitions
Annual sporting events
Multi-national professional sports leagues